A list of films produced by the Marathi language film industry based in Maharashtra in the year 1929.

1929 Releases
A list of Marathi films released in 1929.

References

External links
Gomolo - 

Lists of 1929 films by country or language
1929
1929 in Indian cinema